Ave Kallu is a 1967 Indian Telugu-language mystery thriller film directed by A. C. Tirulokchandar and produced by AVM Productions, starring Krishna and Kanchana. It was simultaneously made in Tamil as Athey Kangal, with Kanchana reprising her role. The film was released on 14 December 1967. It is considered the first Telugu crime film to be entirely made in colour.

Plot 
A woman named Vasantha finds her husband Ranganatha dead, where the masked murderer tries to kill her, but she escapes from him. Vasantha is left in a state of shock and becomes mentally paralysed. A case is registered and the investigation takes place. Susi, a college student, along with her friends, arrives to her aunt Vasanth's home for vacation. There lives  her younger paternal uncles Rajasekhar and Chandrasekhar, her aunt Vasantha, A Butler Naganna,and a regular visiting doctor,Ramayya. During her stay, a series of murders take place at the house with every time a cigar bit being left by the murderer intentionally.

Since Vasantha is the only eyewitness of the murderer, her life is in danger. Despite tight security, Vasantha is killed by the murderer, who frequently makes calls to Susi and threatens that she will be his next target. Susi is frustrated by the incidents at her home and the threatening phone calls. She requests help from her colleague Bhaskar, who also promises her to help. Bhaskar investigates Chandrasekhar, and later Rajasekhar; he follows him to a strange house where a woman who wanders like a ghost. She is actually Rajasekhar's lover, who was rescued some years back by him when she attempted suicide. Rajasekhar kept quiet as he wants Susi to get married first, only then, would he marry his lover. Bhaskar sends everyone out of the house for a night to lure the murderer. As expected, he enters Susi's room to kill her.

Baskar tries to unmask the murderer, but sees his eyes before he escapes leaving his mask behind. Bhaskar finds Chandrasekhar murdered at the doorstep. Rajasekhar wants everyone to vacate the house after celebrating Susi's birthday party. On the day of the party, the murderer attacks Susi. Bhaskar chases him, but loses track. He sees Ramayya injured at a place, rescues him and comes home. No one knows why the murders are happening and who kills every member of their family. Ramayya urges Rajasekhar to tell about his family which might help him find the identity of the murderer. Rajasekhar reveals that his father had an extramarital affair with a woman and they had a son, but the woman and her 10-year old son died 15 years ago, in a fire set by Rajasekhar's elder brother (Susi's father).

Bhaskar theorises that the son may not have died and is actually the murderer killing the family members as vengeance; He also states that the murderer is present along with them as he plan accordingly by knowing the circumstances of the house. Bhaskar places the murderer's mask on the face of each man present to verify whose eyes match with the murderer's eyes, ultimately exposing Ramaiyya, who is not a doctor (being disguised as a doctor), is the murderer.
 
Bhaskar chases him, who gets injured while trying to escape; while he is struggling to run, the police shot him, where he disappeared in a tunnelway in the garden. Everyone finds a secret room beneath the garden which leads to the murderer's house, realising this is how he escaped after committing each murder. Later, Baskar marries Susi and stays happily in the same house,  while Rajasekhar marries his lover.

Cast

Soundtrack 
Music composed by Vedha.

References

External links 
 

1960s mystery thriller films
1960s Telugu-language films
1967 films
AVM Productions films
Films directed by A. C. Tirulokchandar
Indian mystery thriller films